The Cambodian Industrial Food Union Federation (CIFUF) is a trade union federation of food, restaurant, tobacco and informal economy workers in Cambodia. The union was established in 2003 and represents 7,345 members in nine local unions. CIFUF is affiliated with CUNIC.

References

Trade unions in Cambodia
2003 establishments in Cambodia
Trade unions established in 2003
Labour relations in Cambodia